Bjernede Church is a medieval era round church located near Sorø, Denmark. It is one of only seven remaining round churches in Denmark and the only one of its kind on the island of Zealand.

History
The present church was built in circa 1170 by Sune Ebbesen, from the influential Hvide clan who belonged to King Valdemar II's social circle. His father, Ebbe Skjalmsen, the uncle of Bishop Absalon, had previously built a wooden church at the site. The tower of Sune Ebbesen's round church contains a room which the Hvide family used as an assemblage hall.

Architecture
The lower part of the church stands in granite while the upper part is made of brick, a relatively new material at the time which had only been used in Denmark since the 1140s. The inspiration for the design most likely came from the former St. George's Church of Schlamersdorf in Wagria which Sune Ebbesen had visited several times as a military commander. Bjernede Church, Horne Church on Funen and Thorsager Church in Jutland are all built to the same floor plan as that of the Schlamersdorf Church. Four interior granite columns support the roof structure. The porch was built in about 1500 and the tower had previously been altered but was, between 1890 and 1892, changed by architect Hermann Baagøe Storck (1839–1922) to what he believed was its original design.

Influence
Storck was later heavily criticized for his restoration work. Architects Peder Vilhelm Jensen-Klint and Ivar Bentsen later made church projects which resembled Bjernede prior to Storck's intervention, when it had a Bishop's Hat-like roof. Storck's restoration came to mark a turning point in Danish restoration architecture which from then on applied a more sensitive approach to the restoration of historical buildings.

See also
Nordic round churches

References

Other Sources
 K. Paul, Trench  The Architecture of the Churches of Denmark (1892) (Trübner, & Co., ltd.)

External links
Bjernede kirke website

Churches in Sorø Municipality
12th-century churches in Denmark
Round churches
Lutheran churches converted from Roman Catholicism
Churches in the Diocese of Roskilde